The 2011–12 season was FC Dinamo București's 63rd consecutive season in Liga I. In this season, Dinamo played in Liga I, Cupa României and UEFA Europa League, due to the 6th place occupied in the previous season of the Championship.

Dinamo started the season with a new coach, Liviu Ciobotariu, who took the place left by Ioan Andone. The team left again quickly the European scene, being eliminated in the play-off round by the Ukrainian side Vorskla Poltava. In the Liga I, Dinamo had an unexpected start of the season, with five consecutive wins. After the first half of the competition, Dinamo was leading, with one point advantage over the second place, CFR Cluj.

The Spring started badly for Dinamo, with a couple of home defeats against teams that were fighting against relegation (Sportul Studențesc and Petrolul Ploiești). The club decided to sack Ciobotariu and replace him with Dario Bonetti, an Italian manager who led the team in 2008 for a couple of months. But the new management didn't change the fortune of the squad that continued to fall and ended the season only fifth, nine points behind the champions, CFR Cluj.

Instead, Dinamo won the Romanian Cup, their first trophy after five years, and the first trophy in this competition after seven seasons. By virtue of winning the League Cup, Dinamo qualified for the playoffs in the 2012–13 UEFA Europa League.

Players

Current squad
Updated last on 28 February 2012

Squad changes

Transfers in:

Transfers out:

Loans out:

Player statistics

Squad stats
 

|-
|colspan="12"|Players sold or loaned out during the season
|-

Disciplinary record
Includes all competitive matches.

Last updated on 23 May 2012

Club

Technical staff

Competitions

Overall
FC Dinamo plays in three competitions: Liga I, UEFA Europa League and Cupa României.

Liga I

Standings

Results summary

Results by round

Competitive

Liga I
Kickoff times are in EET.

Results

UEFA Europa League

Cupa României

Dinamo București won on aggregate due to away goal

Non competitive matches

Friendly

References

2011-12
Dinamo Bucuresti season
Dinamo Bucuresti